The Hysterectomy Educational Resources & Services (HERS) Foundation is an independent non-profit international women's health educational advocacy organization based in the United States. 

The HERS Foundation researches and testifies before US Government agencies on issues such as drug and medical device reporting and informed consent for gynecological procedures and surgeries.

References

External links
 Official website

Medical and health organizations based in Pennsylvania
Organizations established in 1982
Obstetrics and gynaecology organizations
Women's health in the United States
1982 establishments in the United States